is a town located in Shimajiri District, Okinawa Prefecture, Japan. The town consists of the islands of Kume, Ōjima, Ōhajima, Torishima, and Iōtorishima. Among the islands, only Kumejima and Ōjima are populated. The town can be accessed by the New Kumejima Ferry, Japan Transocean Air, or Ryukyu Air Commuter. Kumejima Airport serves the island.

Kume Island is often said to be one of the most beautiful of the Okinawa Islands. It is well known for its textiles, called Kumejima-tsumugi which are designated an Important Intangible Cultural Property. The town is also known for its Kumesen Awamori (Okinawan sake) and deep sea water.  Kumejima's main industries are sugar cane (sato-kibi), tourism, and deep seawater products.

History
Historically due to Kume's abundance of freshwater, rice was once extensively cultivated. In 1506, the Ryukyu Kingdom invaded Kume under the leadership of Shō Shin. During Ryukyuan rule, Kume Island was often visited by Chinese envoys called "sapposhi" on their way to Shuri Castle on Okinawa Island. When the Ryukyu Kingdom was annexed by Japan, many noble families moved from Shuri to Kume.

In 1945, Japanese soldiers killed 20 inhabitants suspected of being close to the U.S. forces, including a baby and children.

Geography

Numerous unique rock formations around the island can be viewed including Tatami Rocks, Bird Mouth Rock, Miifugaa, Garasaa Mountain, Tachijami, and the Yajiyagama Cave system.

Climate

Kumejima has a humid subtropical climate (Köppen climate classification Cfa) bordering on a tropical rainforest climate (Köppen Af) with very warm summers and mild winters. Precipitation is abundant throughout the year; the wettest month is May and the driest month is July.

Education
Okinawa Prefectural Board of Education operates .

Kumejima Town operates municipal elementary and junior high schools.

Junior high schools:
 Kumejima Nishi Junior High School (久米島西中学校)
 Kumi Junior High School (球美中学校)

Elementary schools:
 Hiyajiyo (比屋定小学校)
 Kumeshima (久米島小学校)
 Misaki (美崎小学校)
 Nakazato (仲里小学校)
 Otake (大岳小学校)
 Shimizu (清水小学校)

Culture

Uezu House is a traditional Ryukyuan Governor's house dating back hundreds of years. The walled grounds contain gardens, a main house, and outlying buildings. The house is a quiet and peaceful look back into the history of Okinawa.

In order to maintain and preserve the historic estate, there is a 300 yen entry fee for adults, payable at the house. If an attendant is not available, it is customary to leave the amount in a tray.

There are five castle sites on Kume Island that can be visited. The most prominent is Uegusuku Castle on Mount Uegusuku, which is the highest situated castle in Okinawa Prefecture. Gushikawa Castle is also designated a National Treasure.

Deep Seawater and OTEC

Since 2001, the Okinawa Prefecture Deep Seawater Research Institute has researched the uses of deep seawater on Kumejima, fostering the development of new aquaculture and production industries totaling $20 million in yearly revenue. Due to the deep seawater resource, Kumejima now has the largest market share of Sea Grapes and Kuruma Prawns in Japan.

In March 2013, Okinawa Prefecture completed the world's only fully operational Ocean Thermal Energy Conversion Demonstration Facility. The facility is open to tours by appointment for free.

Gallery

References

External links

 Kumejima official website 
 English Language Guide
 Official OTEC Website

 
Towns in Okinawa Prefecture
Ramsar sites in Japan